SSOC may stand for:

Southern Student Organizing Committee, an American student activist group
S.T.A.L.K.E.R.: Shadow of Chernobyl, a computer game